Arámbulo is a Spanish surname. Notable people with the surname include:
Cristina Arámbulo Villanueva Manalo (born 1937), the widow of former Iglesia ni Cristo executive minister Eraño G. Manalo
Félix Arámbulo (1942–2018), Paraguayan footballer

See also
Arámbula

Spanish-language surnames